The Victoria's Secret Fashion Show was an annual promotional event sponsored by and featuring Victoria's Secret, a brand of lingerie. From 1995 to 2018, Victoria's Secret used the show to market its goods in high-profile settings.  Models under contract to the company, known as Victoria's Secret Angels, were key participants at the event.  The fashion show was cancelled in 2019, the same year its organizer, Edward Razek, resigned under public pressure.

The fashion show, at its peak viewership in 2001, had millions tuning in to watch and was known to be a lavish event with elaborate costumed lingerie, music by leading entertainers, and set design with changing themes.  With dozens of the world's top fashion models selected to perform in it each year, the fashion show attracted celebrities and entertainers, and regularly featured special performers and acts.

American network television broadcast the Victoria's Secret Fashion Show during prime time. The first few shows in the 1990s were held in the days preceding Valentine's Day, linking the brand to the holiday's romantic theme.  In 1999 and 2000, the show was webcast. Beginning in 2001, the event was shifted to take place ahead of the Christmas and holiday season. The show made its network television broadcast debut on ABC in 2001, with subsequent years (2002 - 2017) broadcast on CBS; the event returned to ABC for the final 2018 edition. The event was frequently held in New York City at the Plaza Hotel or the 69th Regiment Armory, in addition to special host cities including Miami, Los Angeles, Cannes, Paris, London, and Shanghai.

Cancellation, officially announced in November 2019 amid declining ratings and sales and growing criticism of Razek, was influenced by both the reckoning of the Me Too movement, fourth-wave feminism, and the association of L Brands' CEO Les Wexner with sex offender Jeffrey Epstein. Due to the immense amount of criticism, Victoria's Secret Fashion Show reconsidered its marketing strategy, which ultimately contributed to the end of the runway shows. The brand's focus changed to digital-platform marketing with the aim of restoring its reputation. Critics of the Victoria's Secret Fashion Show considered it objectifying, lacking in diversity of body sizes, and repeatedly inclined towards offensive cultural appropriation with its designs.

On March 5, 2023, Victoria’s Secret announced it would bring back the fashion show in a new format after a four-year hiatus.

History

1995–2005 
The first fashion show, introduced by Stephanie Seymour, was held at the Plaza Hotel in New York City in August 1995. The show also featured Beverly Peele and Frederique van der Wal.  The inaugural show occurred two months before The Limited, parent company of Victoria's Secret owner Intimate Brands, sold an initial public offering of a 16 percent stake in the company at the New York Stock Exchange (NYSE).  Supermodel Stephanie Seymour rang the closing bell at the NYSE as part of the publicity campaign after the event had been promoted by full page adds in the Wall Street Journal. The subsequent three annual shows were also held at the Plaza Hotel.

In 1999, during Super Bowl XXXIII, Victoria's Secret announced a 72-hour countdown to the webcast of their fashion show, which resulted in over 2 million viewers. Parent company Intimate Brands bought a $1.5 million, 30-second television advertisement during the Super Bowl broadcast and spent an additional $4 million on international newspaper publicity.  The event, hosted by Broadcast.com, featured Tyra Banks, Laetitia Casta, Heidi Klum, Karen Mulder, Daniela Peštová, Inés Rivero, and Seymour. In 1999 and 2000, the show was broadcast live on the internet.

The May 2000 fashion show, held in France in sync with the Cannes Film Festival, was made with production help from Harvey Weinstein.  The event raised $3.5 million for the Cinema Against AIDS charity.

The 2001 show, hosted by Rupert Everett, returned to New York City and was held at Bryant Park in the Valhalla structure, designed by Rudi Enos. All proceeds went towards the victims of the September 11 attacks. That year, the show made its broadcast debut on ABC, drawing millions of viewers as well as some controversy; the Federal Communications Commission received many complaints about the broadcast.

From 2002 through 2005, it was held at the Lexington Avenue Armory in New York City.

The 2004 show was canceled due to fallout from the Super Bowl halftime show controversy, an event known for accidental indecency with a "wardrobe malfunction".  In place of the fashion show, the company sent the Angels (Tyra Banks, Heidi Klum, Gisele Bündchen, Adriana Lima, and Alessandra Ambrosio) on an Angels Across America Tour in 2004 to promote the brand through visit to four major cities: New York City, Miami, Las Vegas, and Los Angeles.

2006–2012 
Victoria's Secret sister brand PINK made its debut on the runway starting in 2006 and was regularly featured in a segment of the fashion show each year afterward.

In 2006 and 2007, the Victoria's Secret fashion shows were held at the Kodak Theatre in Los Angeles.  On November 13, 2007, the company's Angels were honored with a star on the Hollywood Walk of Fame outside the Kodak Theatre as part of a celebration to mark Victoria's Secret's 25th anniversary on Hollywood Boulevard. Justin Timberlake opened the show with his song "Sexy Back". This fashion show included the final walk of Gisele Bündchen.

The 2007 show featured a performance by the Spice Girls, the first American TV debut of the band's comeback.  After Kanye West canceled his appearance, will.i.am was called to perform in his place.

The 2008 show coincided with the grand re-opening of the Fontainebleau Miami Beach hotel and had Usher as a featured performer. Unlike the other shows, the runway was designed parallel with the audience seats.

In 2009, the fashion show returned to the Lexington Avenue Armory and featured the “Victoria's Secret Model Search”, a competition to find a new runway Angel with the winner announced as Kylie Bisutti.

The 2010 Victoria's Secret Fashion show aired on November 30, 2010, on CBS, and featured performances by Katy Perry and Akon. A promotional ad featured a lipdub for Katy Perry's "Firework". As of 2010, 152 models have walked the show.

In 2011, Kanye West started his song "Stronger" with a tribute to his mother who had died before his scheduled performance four years before, saying: "In 2007, I was supposed to perform this song on this show ...and I lost my superhero. Now she's my super-angel."

In 2012, an outfit worn by model Karlie Kloss, which was reminiscent of Native American attire, sparked controversy due to its alleged stereotypical depiction of Native Americans, which amounted to cultural appropriation. Victoria's Secret released a statement of apology shortly after, saying that they will remove it from future advertisements and the broadcast. Kloss apologized on her Twitter account for the outfit and expressed her support for the outfit's removal in the broadcast.

2013–2019 

The 2013 Victoria's Secret Fashion Show featured performances by Taylor Swift, A Great Big World, Neon Jungle, and Fall Out Boy. Swift performed "I Knew You Were Trouble", A Great Big World performed "Say Something", UK's Neon Jungle made their US television debut with "Trouble", and Fall Out Boy performed with Taylor Swift in "My Songs Know What You Did In The Dark" and later performed "The Phoenix".

In 2014, the Victoria's Secret Fashion show featured performances by Taylor Swift; Ed Sheeran, Ariana Grande, and Hozier. Swift performed "Blank Space" and "Style". Ed Sheeran performed "Thinking Out Loud". Ariana Grande performed "Love Me Harder", "Bang Bang", "Break Free", and "Problem". Hozier performed "Take Me to Church". During the show, Ariana Grande was performing and was hit by accident by Elsa Hosk's wings.

In 2015, the show featured performances by The Weeknd, Selena Gomez, and Ellie Goulding. The Weeknd performed "In the Night" and "Can't Feel My Face" for the show, while Gomez performed a medley of "Hands to Myself" and "Me & My Girls" for the PINK segment. Goulding was contracted as a replacement for Rihanna, who had canceled her appearance just one week before the show in order to focus on recording her album Anti. Goulding performed "Army" and "Love Me Like You Do" for the show.

In 2016, the Victoria's Secret Fashion show featured performances by The Weeknd (performed "Starboy"), Lady Gaga (performed "Million Reasons", plus a medley of "A-Yo" and "John Wayne"), and Bruno Mars (performed "Chunky" for the Pink brand and "24k Magic" for the VS brand). The executive producer of Victoria's Secret, Ed Razek, chose Grand Palais in Paris, France, as the show's location. A major challenge faced with the show was the size of the building and how the show could be showcased on a small TV, as well as the natural lighting in the building, which would get in the way of the tradition of the show being held at night.

The 2017 show was held in Shanghai, China and was the first Victoria's Secret Fashion Show to be held in Asia. The show featured the first-ever segment in collaboration with another brand, French fashion house Balmain. The theme and designs were co-steered by Victoria's Secret and Balmain creative director Olivier Rousteing. Performers included Harry Styles (performed Kiwi and Only Angel), Miguel (performed Pineapple Skies and Told You So), Jane Zhang (performed a medley of Work For It, 808, and Dust My Shoulders Off), and Leslie Odom Jr. (performed Winter Song). A performance by Katy Perry was canceled due to her visa to travel to China being revoked. A week before the show was due to be filmed, model Gigi Hadid stated that she had been denied access to the show. Russian models were also reportedly denied visas for entry to China.

In November 2018, the company's chief of marketing Ed Razek was criticized for comments he made in an interview with Vogue, suggesting that the fashion show did not cast trans women—whom he referred to using the now-rejected term "transsexuals"—because "the show is a fantasy". Razek apologized for the "insensitive" comments, noting that trans women have attempted to audition for the show in the past, but that "it was never about gender. I admire and respect their journey to embrace who they really are." Razek also faced criticism for similar comments regarding plus-size models, stating they had not attempted to do a show for them since 2000 since there was no viewer interest.  Criticism of Razek for anachronistic and misogynistic business practices intensified, from both inside and outside the company, and he resigned in August 2019.

Cancellation  
In May 2019, it was reported that L Brands CEO Les Wexner had issued a memo questioning the future of the show, stating that network television was no longer the "right fit", and that the company planned to focus on "developing exciting and dynamic content and a new kind of event." Viewership of the show had fallen from 9.2 million viewers in 2014 to 3.2 million in 2018. Victoria's Secret had also been experiencing an overall decline due to increasing competition, as well as changing perceptions to the company's marketing—which a retail analyst described as encouraging women to objectify themselves to "impress men".

On November 21, 2019, L Brands CFO Stuart Burgdoerfer officially confirmed that the 2019 fashion show had been canceled, citing its declining viewership and lack of immediate "material impact" on Victoria's Secret sales post-broadcast. He re-affirmed that Victoria's Secret was "figuring out how to advance the positioning of the brand and best communicate that to customers".  The New York Times reported that the company was seeking to distance itself from the controversy following fallout from the Jeffrey Epstein sexual abuse scandal and Wexner's ties to Epstein. The last official broadcast of the Victoria's Secret Fashion show was in December 2018.

Wings as a design element
The wings were first introduced in the 1998 Victoria's Secret Fashion Show.  A consistent feature of each year's collection, wings were included as a part of some outfits. The idea to feature wings as part of the collection came in the wake of the immense success of the "Angels"-bra line, which was advertised with the models Tyra Banks, Helena Christensen, Karen Mulder, Daniela Pestova, and Stephanie Seymour wearing wings.  The same models who were featured in the campaigns for the "Angel"-bra line, with the exception of Chandra North filling in the spot for Christensen, walked the runway with Angel wings on.. Over the years, the show featured various forms and sizes of wings, such as butterfly, peacock, or devil wings, which have become emblematic of the Victoria's Secret brand. The wings were, at times, ornamental back pieces worn by the models on the runway, with limited resemblance to traditional wings. Some models considered it an honor to wear the wings.

Adriana Lima has worn the most winged costumes in the history of the show. With her count of 24 sets of wings, she is followed by Candice Swanepoel who has worn 20 pair of wings.

Critical review 
The early webcasts were criticized for poor connection, and users that could connect were subjected to low video quality. One critic from The New York Times described the initial 20th-century webcast experience as having felt like he was "watching a striptease through a keyhole".

Some critics have described the 21st-century televised editions of the show as pornographic,  while others have described it as both "outright commercialism" and indistinguishable from an infomercial. The Federal Communications Commission has received complaints regarding the broadcast, but no fines have been imposed, with the FCC, following the 2001 airing, citing the First Amendment and stating that "sexual or excretory activities or organs in a patently offensive manner as measured by contemporary community standards for the broadcast medium" were not broadcast.  In the initial 2001 airing ABC blurred the screen on particularly sheer lingerie.  This enabled the show to pass muster with its internal Broadcast Standards and Practices department and to achieve a TV Parental Guidelines rating of TV-14 (a rating maintained for each broadcast presentation over the years), as a TV-MA rating is virtually unmarketable for advertisers on broadcast television.  In 2002, the National Organization for Women protested the show calling it a "soft-core porn infomercial".   They were joined in protest by the Parents Television Council and other watchdog organizations. Despite the program's timeslot and parental ratings, some affiliates have chosen not to air the program, including Fisher Communications' CBS stations in Boise and Idaho Falls, Idaho, in the past.  In 2009, the American Decency Association organized email letters of protests to sponsors of the show including AT&T, Kentucky Fried Chicken, Netflix, Nikon, and Reebok. CBS described the event as "the Super Bowl of fashion" in 2014.

Summary table

Fantasy Bra 

Typically, one model is chosen among the Angels to wear a bejeweled bra dubbed the "Fantasy Bra". It was first advertised in the Victoria's Secret catalog, but since 2001 has been worn in the fashion shows. Prior to each fashion show, Victoria's Secret contracts a renowned jewelry designer to craft the bra to be used as a focal point for promoting the fashion show and as a centerpiece within it. However, only the centerpiece from the 2004 Heavenly "70" Fantasy Bra and the 2012 Floral Fantasy Bra and Gift Set have found a buyer. If not bought, the bras are usually dismantled after a year.

Heidi Klum and Adriana Lima have worn the Fantasy Bra in three different years. Gisele Bündchen, Tyra Banks, Karolína Kurková, and Alessandra Ambrosio have each worn two Fantasy Bras. Tyra Banks also wore the 1996 Million Dollar Miracle Bra during the 1999 fashion show. As of 2018, the fantasy bra has been worn 8 times by a Brazilian model, 5 times by an American model, 4 times by a German model, and 3 times by a Czech model.

The $15 million price tag for the 2000 bra worn by Gisele Bündchen earned a place in the Guinness World Records as the most expensive item of lingerie ever created. The $3 million 2009 Harlequin Fantasy Bra and the $2 million 2010 Bombshell Fantasy Bra were designed by Damiani. Listed below are the prices per set (including accessories) for the 2007 and 2013 editions, the 2013 bra alone is worth $10,000,000. The 2012 Floral Fantasy Bra was accompanied by a $500,000 perfume bottle.

In 2014, for the first time, two fantasy bras were created. They were worn by Alessandra Ambrosio and Adriana Lima and were valued at $2,000,000 each.

Fantasy Bra count

Swarovski
Since 2003, similar to the Fantasy Bra, one or more models are chosen to wear the "Swarovski Outfit" and the "Swarovski Wings" every year. The first Swarovski items that were shown on the runway were given to Alessandra Ambrosio. Victoria's Secret had worked with Swarovski for 9 years prior to the Swarovski items worn on the runway in 2011.

Alessandra Ambrosio's Swarovski outfit, worn in 2011, included a 60-pound wing which was made out of 105,000 Swarovski crystals. The base of her wing was made out of 23-carat gold. Cameron Russell was given the "10th Anniversary" Swarovski outfit, worn in 2012, celebrating Victoria's Secret's 10th year working with Swarovski.

The 2013 Swarovski outfit was a 3D printed piece given to Lindsay Ellingson, which included mini-micro Swarovski crystals. In 2017, Elsa Hosk was chosen to wear the 15th Anniversary Swarovski outfit, which came out to a total value of $1,000,000.

Show Opening & Closing models

Opening count 
In 23 editions (1995–2003; 2005–18), 13 models have opened the show.

Closing count 
In 23 editions (1995–2003; 2005–18), 17 models have closed the show.

See also 

 List of Victoria's Secret models
 Women's beachwear fashion

References

External links 

 Victoria's Secret website
 Photos from the 2013 Victoria's Secret Fashion Show

Annual events in the United States
CBS television specials
Christmas television specials
Fashion events in the United States
Victoria's Secret